The Sriburapha Award is a Thai award, established in 1988 in honor of Kulap Saipradit, whose pen name was Sriburapha. The award recognizes excellence in journalism, writing, and/or the arts. It is presented annually by the Sriburapha Fund at an awards ceremony on May 5, National Writer's Day in Thailand.

Recipients 
 1988 Sakchai Bumrungpong† (pen name Seni Saowaphong)
 1990 Amphan Chaiworasin
 1991 Nilawan Pintong
 1992 Achin Panchaphan†
 1993 Sujit Wongthes†
 1994 Sulak Sivaraksa
 1995 Karuna Kusalasai
 1996 Naowarat Phongphaibun†
 1997 Suchart Sawatsi
 1998 Witthayakon Chiangkun
 1999 Suphat Sawatdirak
 2000 Somchai Katanyutanant (pen name Chai Ratchawat)
 2001 Sathian Chanthimat
 2002 Nidhi Eoseewong
 2003 Thirayut Bunmi and Seksan Prasertkun
 2004 Sombun Woraphong
 2005 was the centennial of Sriburapha's birth:
Suwat Woradilok† for writing
Khanchai Boonpan for journalism
Saneh Chamrik for peace activism
 2006 Surachai Chanthimathorn (stage name Nga Caravan)
 2007 Wat Wanlayangkun
 2008 Suthichai Yoon
 2009 Charnvit Kasetsiri

† Also a Thailand National Artist

Lists of Thai people